Richard William Ervin Jr. (born Richard Reehorse Ervin, January 26, 1905 – August 24, 2004) was the Florida Attorney General from 1949 to 1964 and served as chief justice of the Florida Supreme Court from 1969 to 1971. He is credited with guiding the state from segregation (based on the brief he wrote to the United States Supreme Court's request from each state's Attorney General on how to rule regarding Brown v. Board of Education), and desegregating its schools. His son, Richard W. Ervin III, was a judge of the First District Court of Appeal for 30 years and retired at the end of 2006.

Ervin was a graduate of the University of Florida where he was a member of Phi Kappa Tau fraternity and earned his law degree at the University of Florida College of Law in 1928.  Following his retirement, he was of counsel to the law firm founded by his brother Robert Ervin, in Tallahassee.  He received an honorary degree from Florida State University. From 1954 to 1975, Ervin was a national director of the fraternal organization Woodmen of the World.

References

1905 births
2004 deaths
People from Carrabelle, Florida
University of Florida alumni
Florida Attorneys General
Justices of the Florida Supreme Court
Florida lawyers
Florida Democrats
20th-century American judges
Chief Justices of the Florida Supreme Court
Fredric G. Levin College of Law alumni
20th-century American lawyers